A crépinette is a small, flattened sausage, sometimes referred to as a sausage parcel.  It is similar in shape to a sausage patty, circular, and flattened.

It is made from minced or ground pork, turkey, veal, lamb or chicken, and can even be made from truffles.

Crépinettes are wrapped in caul fat, rather than wrapped in a casing. It is usually cooked with an outer coating of bread and sautéed in butter.

Name
The word crépine is French for "pig's caul". The name originated in the second half of the 13th century as "a small ornamental crêpe", being derived from the word crêpe. In cookbooks, the term crépinette is sometimes used to indicate the contents of the crépinette only. This is the same as other countries where we find crépinette, sometimes spelled crepinette, to describe both the contents and the dish itself.

Definition

A crépinette is a mixture of minced meat stuffed in intestinal membrane.
Although it has a different casing from sausage, it is often described as a sausage dish. It is also described as a round and flat dish in a number of French dictionaries.
The crépinette distinguishes itself by being balled meat wrapped in thin slices of meat.

Composition

The stuffing of the crépinette can be made of ground pork, chicken fillets, finely ground game birds (partridge, woodcock, pigeon), and also lamb sweetbreads, calf kidneys, fillets of lark or rabbit, and sliced eel. Viard, however, gives recipes where the contents of the crépinette are not ground but entire pieces of meat.

Cooking
The crépinette is cooked in a pan or on a grill.

For Christmas, crépinettes are served with oysters by the oyster farmers of the Marennes-Oléron basin; the same happens in Bordelais where an expert alternates the tasting of a fresh oyster and a hot crépinette.

See also

 Skilpadjies
 Faggot (food)
 Sheftalia

References

From The New Food Lover's Companion 3rd ed Sharon Tyler Herbst 2001 p 179

External links

French sausages
Culinary arts